Kalyana Veedu is a 2018-2020 Indian Tamil-language soap opera directed by Thirumurugan. The show stars Thirumurugan, Kannika Ravi, Spoorty Gowda, R.  Sundarrajan, Mouli, Anjana, Sree Priya, Gopi, Benze, Dona Shanker, and Ankitha Bhat.

Synopsis
Gopi, a sales representative and a part-time singer at an orchestra, goes through various trials and tribulations to ensure the well-being of his family. After a roller-coaster ride, Gopi finally register marriages Surya. In pursuit of searching job, Gopi meets a Manikkavasan who unbeknownst to Gopi had married the wife of Kathiresan. Manikkavasan has made Gopi as his adopted son (as it makes him the brother of Surya whom he married). The interesting twist is Gopi had only registered his marriage with Surya but not tied the mangal sutra (which means he is married and not married).

Cast

Main
 Thirumurugan as Gopi Krishnan - Surya husband, Sivagami and Muthaiah's Son, Anushya, Ramya, Savitha brother also Kalaivani , Manmadhan (main lead) (2018–present)
R.Sundarrajan as Kathiresan - Surya and Roja father, Manikkavasam friend (2018–present)
Mouli as Manikkavasam - Gopi adopted father, Kathiresan friend, Selvarani adopted brother (2019–present)
Spoorthy Gowda as Surya Gopikrishnan - Roja's elder sister, Gopi wife, Kathiresan and Selvarani daughter (main lead) (2018-2020)
 Kannika Ravi (601-present) as Surya (Replaced Spoorthy) (2020-end)
Anjana as Swetha Suman - Suman wife, Gopi’s best friend, Prathiksha mother, Nandakumar sister (main lead) (2018–present)
Sree Priya as Roja Selvanraja - Raja's wife, Surya's younger sister, Kathiresan and Selvarani daughter. (main antagonist) (2018–present)
Gopi as Selvanraja " Raja", Roja's husband, Surya ex fiancée, Gopi's friend (2018–present)
Benze as Anushya - Gopi Sister, Sivagami and muthaiah daughter, Savitha, Ramya sister, Archana mother, Raman ex wife, Surya sister in law. (2018–present)
Dona Shanker as Ramya Manohar - Anushya, Savitha sister, Sivagami and muthaiah daughter, Manohar wife, Kala daughter in law, Revathi sister in law. (2018–present)
Ankitha Bhat as Savitha - Pichaimani wife, Mutthaiah and Sivagami daughter, Gopi sister; anushya, Ramya sister and Padmavathi's daughter in law (2018–present)
Pop Suresh as Manohar, Periyaswamy and Kala son, Ramya husband, Revathi brother. (2018–present)
Hema Srikanth as Kala, Periyaswamy's wife, Manohar & Revathi's mother, Ramya'mother-in-law, Sakunthala's sister. (2018–present)
Sathya as Sumandan "Suman", Swetha husband, Prathiksha father, Nandakumar brother in law. (2019–present)
Munish Raja as Samantham, Anushya husband, Kalaivani ex love interest. (2020–present)
Ravi Raj as Pichaimani, Parvathy son, Padmavathi's brother, Savitha husband, Kannan and Gopi brother in law. (2018–present)
Jeyanthi as Sivagami Mutthaiah, mutthaiah wife, Gopi mother: Anshaya, Ramya, Savitha mother, Mutthaiah wife, Periyaswamy sister, Kala sister in law (2018–present)

Supporting cast 

Kalaivani
 Bhagyalakshmi as Selvarani, Manikam's wife 
 Sampath as Nondhakumar, Swetha's brother, Gopi's friend
Smaleen Monica as Sulochana, Swetha friend, Nandakumar Wife
 Aishwarya Ramsai as Archana Raman, Anushya and Raman's daughter
 Prathiksha as Prathiksha Suman, Swetha and Suman's daughter
 Jayaraman as Periyasamy, Kala's husband
 Seema as Revathi Periyasamy, Manoharan's sister
 Jeyashree as Sakunthala Perumal, Kala's younger sister, Perumal's wife
 Radhika as Kavitha, Suganthi's assistant
 Meenatchi as Parvathi Parthasarathy, Piachaimani's mother
 Arunadevi as Padmavathi Kannan, Pichaimani's sister
  as Kannan, Pichaimani's uncle, Padmavathi's husband 
 Priya Rathnakumar as Pavithra Kannan, Pichaimani's niece, Padmavathi's daughter
 Bavithran as Jithu, a womaniser who desires Savitha. Died in serial 
 Saranya as Kausalya, Kathiresan's neighbour
 Kannan as Shekar, Gopi's friend.
 Yuvan Pattison as Bharath, Roja's friend
 Muthu Kumara Swamy as Raman, Anushya ex-husband 
Geethanjali as Suganthi , Raman 2nd Wife 
 Kartic Krishna as Singapore Subramani
 Palaniappan as Selvam

Past cast
 Aishwarya as Revathi Periyasamy
Geetha as Sakunthala Perumal 
 Punitha as Pavithra Kannan
 Ishitha as Suganthi Raman
 Sangeetha as Selva Rani (flashback role)
Arunkumar Padmanabhan as Balakondaya (flashback role)

Soundtrack

Reception

Ratings
In the table below, the blue numbers represent the lowest ratings and the red numbers represent the highest ratings.

Impact 
In September 2019, there was a complaint against the content of Kalyana Veedu following which the telecaster Sun TV was fined Rs 250,000 by the Broadcast Content Complaints Council. This was in reference to one of the episodes aired in May where one of the female characters named Roja hires a criminal gang to sexually assault her own sister. She ordered the men to show no mercy on her during this preplanned assault. The gang instead of following through the plan, enact the same plan on Roja. The controversial episodes were telecast on May 14, 15 and June 28, 2019.

The council, on examining the video clips based on the complaints, said in their order that the content violated the Indian Broadcasting Foundation (IBF) guidelines which bars content that glorifies violence, as well as incite or encourage viewers to obscene or indecent behaviour. A notice was issued to the channel and in their reply to the council, Sun TV and Thiru Pictures clarified and apologised to the council. The order stated that they consented to agree with their decision as well.

References

External links
 

Sun TV original programming
2010s Tamil-language television series
2018 Tamil-language television series debuts
Tamil-language television shows